The Epsilon Launch Vehicle, or  (formerly Advanced Solid Rocket), is a Japanese solid-fuel rocket designed to launch scientific satellites. It is a follow-on project to the larger and more expensive M-V rocket which was retired in 2006. The Japan Aerospace Exploration Agency (JAXA) began developing the Epsilon in 2007. It is capable of placing a 590 kg payload into Sun-synchronous orbit.

Vehicle description 
The development aim is to reduce the US$70 million launch cost of an M-V; the Epsilon costs US$38 million per launch. Development expenditures by JAXA exceeded US$200 million.

To reduce the cost per launch the Epsilon uses the existing SRB-A3, a solid rocket booster on the H-IIA rocket, as its first stage. Existing M-V upper stages will be used for the second and third stages, with an optional fourth stage available for launches to higher orbits. The J-I rocket, which was developed during the 1990s but abandoned after just one launch, used a similar design concept, with an H-II booster and Mu-3S-II upper stages.

The Epsilon is expected to have a shorter launch preparation time than its predecessors; a function called "mobile launch control" greatly shortens the launch preparation time, and needs only eight people at the launch site, compared with 150 people for earlier systems.

Enhanced version 
After the successful launch of the Epsilon first flight (demonstration flight), the improvement plan was decided to handle the planned payloads (ERG and ASNARO-2).

Requirements for the improvement:
 Apogee ≧ 28700 km (summer launch), ≧ 31100 km (winter launch) of a 365 kg payload
 Sun-synchronous orbit (500 km) of a ≧ 590 kg payload
 Larger fairing

Planned characteristics:
 Height: 26.0 m
 Diameter: 2.5 m
 Mass: 95.1 t (Standard) / 95.4 t (optional 4th stage (post-boost stage))

Catalog performance according to IHI Aerospace:
 Low-earth orbit 250 km × 500 km for 1.5 t
 Sun-synchronous orbit 500 km × 500 km for 0.6 t

Final characteristics:
 Height: 26.0 m
 Diameter: 2.6 m (max), 2.5 m (fairing)
 Mass: 95.4 t (standard) / 95.7 t (optional)

Epsilon S 
Epsilon's first stage has been the modified SRB-A3 which is the solid-rocket booster of H-IIA. As the H-IIA is to be decommissioned and to be replaced by H3, Epsilon is to be replaced by new version, named Epsilon S.

Major changes of Epsilon S from Epsilon are:
 The first stage is based on SRB-3, the strap-on solid-rocket booster of H3.
 The third stage is a new design, whereas Epsilon's third stage was based on the M-V's third stage. New third stage is three-axis stabilized using Post-Boost Stage (PBS), whereas Epsilon's third stage was spin-stabilized. Also the third stage is outside the fairing, whereas Epsilon's fairing covered the third stage.
 The Epsilon S Post-Boost Stage is mandatory, whereas Epsilon's PBS was optional.

Planned performance of Epsilon S is:
 Sun-synchronous orbit (350 - 700 km): ≧ 600 kg
 Low-earth orbit (500 km): ≧ 1400 kg

The first launch of Epsilon S is planned in 2023.

Launch statistics

Launch outcomes

Launch history 
Epsilon launch vehicles are launched from a pad at the Uchinoura Space Center previously used by Mu launch vehicles. The maiden flight, carrying the SPRINT-A scientific satellite, lifted off at 05:00 UTC (14:00 JST) on 14 September 2013. The launch was conducted at a cost of US$38 million.

On 27 August 2013, the first planned launch of the launch vehicle had to be aborted 19 seconds before liftoff because of a botched data transmission. A ground-based computer had tried to receive data from the launch vehicle 0.07 seconds before the information was actually transmitted.

Planned launches 

Sources: Japanese Cabinet

Internet data leak 
In November 2012, JAXA reported that there had been a possible leak of rocket data due to a computer virus. JAXA had previously been a victim of cyber-attacks, possibly for espionage purposes. Solid-fuel rocket data potentially has military value, and Epsilon is considered as potentially adaptable to an intercontinental ballistic missile. The Japan Aerospace Exploration Agency removed the infected computer from its network, and said its M-V rocket and H-IIA and H-IIB rockets may have been compromised.

See also 

 Comparison of orbital launchers families
 Comparison of orbital launch systems

References

External links 

 Epsilon launch vehicle, JAXA
  Epsilon Photobook "EPSILON THE ROCKET"
 
 Epsilon Launch Vehicle, IHI Aerospace

2013 in spaceflight
Solid-fuel rockets
Space launch vehicles of Japan
Vehicles introduced in 2013
Expendable space launch systems